Gail Armstrong is an American politician and businesswoman serving as a member of the New Mexico House of Representatives from the 49th district.

Early life 
Armstrong was born in Socorro, New Mexico and raised on a ranch near Magdalena, New Mexico.

Career 
Prior to serving in the New Mexico House of Representatives, Armstrong was a member of the committee that organizes the Socorro County Fair. Armstrong was also a board member and one-time president of the Magdalena Municipal School District. She served on the board of the Natural Lands Protection Committee and New Mexico School Board Association, New Mexico Sentencing Commission, and New Mexico State Apprenticeship Council. Armstrong has also founded and operated several small businesses, including a plumbing company and boutique hotel. Armstrong also worked as a political aide in the office of House Speaker Don Tripp, who she succeeded in the upon Tripp's retirement.

In 2019, Armstrong voted against a bill to expand background checks on private firearms, citing the potential difficulty of enforcing new regulations in rural New Mexico.

Personal life 
Armstrong and her husband, Dale, have four children.

References 

Women state legislators in New Mexico
Republican Party members of the New Mexico House of Representatives
Living people
Year of birth missing (living people)
People from Socorro, New Mexico
People from New Mexico
21st-century American politicians
21st-century American women politicians